The Porsche 918 Spyder is a limited-production mid-engine plug-in hybrid sports car manufactured by German automobile manufacturer Porsche. The 918 Spyder's 6.8kWh lithium-ion battery pack delivers an all-electric range of  under the US Environmental Protection Agency's five-cycle tests.

Production began on 18 September 2013, with deliveries initially scheduled to begin in December 2013, and a starting price of ≈€781,000 (US$845,000 or £711,000). The 918 Spyder was sold out in December 2014 and production ended in June 2015.

The 918 Spyder was first shown as a concept at the 80th Geneva Motor Show in March 2010. On 28 July 2010, after 2,000 declarations of interest, the supervisory board of Porsche AG approved series development of the 918 Spyder. The production version was unveiled at the September 2013 Frankfurt Motor Show. Porsche also unveiled the RSR racing variant of the 918 at the 2011 North American International Auto Show, which combines hybrid technology first used in the 997 GT3 R Hybrid, with styling from the 918 Spyder. However, the 918 RSR didn't make it to production. The 918 Spyder was the second plug-in hybrid car manufactured by Porsche, after the 2014 Panamera S E-Hybrid.

Specifications

The 918 Spyder is powered by a  naturally aspirated V8 engine built on the same architecture as the one used in the RS Spyder Le Mans Prototype racing car without any engine belts.

This is supplemented by two electric motors delivering an additional . One  electric motor drives the rear wheels in parallel with the engine and also serves as the main generator. This motor and engine deliver power to the rear axle via a 7-speed gearbox coupled to Porsche's own PDK double-clutch system. The front  electric motor directly drives the front axle; an electric clutch decouples the motor when not in use.

In Car and Driver‘s independent test of the Porsche 918 they achieved  in 2.2 seconds,  in 4.9 seconds,  in 17.5 seconds, and the quarter mile in 9.8 seconds. In Motor Trend's independent test the Porsche 918 set a production-car track record at Willow Springs Raceway. With a time of 2.4 seconds, it was the fastest car to 60 mph that they had ever tested.

The energy storage system is a 312-cell, liquid-cooled 6.8kWh lithium-ion battery positioned behind the passenger cell. In addition to a plug-in charge port at the passenger-side B pillar, the batteries are also charged by regenerative braking and by excess output from the engine when the car is coasting.  emissions are 79g/km and fuel consumption is  under the New European Driving Cycle (NEDC).

The 4.6 litre V8 petrol engine can recharge an empty battery on about two litres of fuel. The supplied Porsche Universal Charger requires seven hours to charge the battery on a typical 120V household AC socket or two hours on a 240V charger. A DC charging station can restore the battery to full capacity in 25 minutes.

The total range with a full tank of gasoline and a fully charged battery is  according to EPA tests. Two hybrid modes (Hybrid, and Race) use both the engine and electric motors to provide the desired levels of economy and performance. In Race mode a push-to-pass button initiates the Hot Lap setting, which delivers additional electrical power.
The chassis is a carbon-fibre-reinforced plastic monocoque and the brake system is boosted electrically (rather than the traditional vacuum boost).

Sales and production
The production version was unveiled at the 2013 Frankfurt Motor Show. The 918 Spyder was produced in a limited series and it was developed in Weissach and assembled in Zuffenhausen for the 2014 model year. Production for the 2014 model year started on 18 September 2013, with deliveries scheduled to begin in December 2013. Sales in the United States began in June 2014.

Production ended in June 2015 as scheduled. 

The country with the most orders is the United States with 297 units, followed by China and Germany with approximately 100 orders each, and Canada ordering 35 units.

According to JATO Dynamics, a total of 105 units have been registered worldwide during the first nine months of 2014. The United States is the leading market with 202 units delivered up to May 2015. , a total of 9 units were registered in Switzerland, 6 in the Netherlands, 5 units in Canada, 4 in Sweden, 3 in Brazil and 1 in South Africa.

Weissach Package 
The Weissach Package is a weight saving and aerodynamics package offered by Porsche for the 918 Spyder. It was an $84,000 factory option in the US. The package included magnesium wheels and an extended rear diffuser, interior parts covered in Alcantara instead of leather. The windscreen frame, roof, rear wings, and rear-view mirrors were also made out of carbon fiber.

Porsche 918 RSR

At the 2011 North American International Auto Show in Detroit, Porsche unveiled the RSR racing variant of the 918 Spyder. Instead of using plug-in hybrid technology, power for the two electric motors is provided by a flywheel accumulator KERS system that sits beside the driver in the passenger compartment. The V8 is a further development of the direct injection engine from the RS Spyder race car developing  at 10,300RPM. The six-speed gearbox is a development of the unit from the RS Spyder.

Nürburgring lap time record
In September 2013 a 918 fitted with the optional 'Weissach Package' set a Nürburgring lap time of 6:57 on the  road course, reducing the previous record by 14 seconds, and making it the first street-legal production car to break the 7-minute barrier.

Gallery

See also
List of production cars by power output
Government incentives for plug-in electric vehicles
List of modern production plug-in electric vehicles

Notes

References

External links

 Official Porsche website
 Official Porsche 918 Spyder website
 Porsche 918 Photos and Information

918 Spyder
Flagship vehicles
Grand tourers
Hybrid electric cars
Plug-in hybrid vehicles
Rear mid-engine, all-wheel-drive vehicles
Roadsters
Vehicles with four-wheel steering
Cars introduced in 2013